The Safine-ye Solaymani ("Ship of Solayman") is a Persian travel account of an embassy sent to the Siamese Ayutthaya Kingdom in 1685 by Suleiman I (1666–1694), King (Shah) of Safavid Iran. The text was written by Mohammad Rabi ibn Mohammad Ebrahim, the secretary of the embassy. The text provides excellent information on Iran's historical and cultural presence in the eastern Indian Ocean region. It also gives many details about Siam's late seventeenth century Iranian community. It is the only extant Persian source for the rich history of Safavid contacts with this particular region of the world.

Translations 

  (An English translation of the Safine-ye Solaymani based on a manuscript housed at the British Museum. Contains notes and an introduction by the translator)

Sources
 
 
 

Persian literature
Safavid Iran
17th century in the Ayutthaya Kingdom
Iran–Thailand relations
Travel books
Historiography of Thailand